The 2015–16 season is the 84th season in Málaga CF's history and its 35th in the top-tier.

Current squad

Out on loan

Personnel

Current technical staff

Competitions

Overall

Overview

La Liga

League table

Results summary

Result round by round

Matches

See also
2015–16 La Liga

References

Málaga CF seasons
Málaga CF